ToneScript is a description syntax for the characteristics of call-progress tones.

A call progress tone is a pattern of audible tones played to the caller in a telephone call, conveying the status of the call. ToneScript describes the pattern of frequency, cadence, and level of the signal. Many Internet telephony devices support configuration options for users to customize the tones, but standard patterns are provided for various telephone administrations. ToneScript is used in Sipura, Linksys and Cisco family of IP telephony products.

Format
A ToneScript syntax may have at most 120 characters.
A calling tone may use up to 6 frequency components  where 
A cadence section  indicates its Duration  followed by up to 6 subsections  in parenthesis. A subsection consists of an ON duration (* for always on), an OFF duration and the list of frequency components  used in that subsection.

A FreqScript is a sequence of frequencies  in hertz and their corresponding levels  in dBm
@@
A Tone Script has a frequency specification and one or two cadence sections.

Examples
 350@-19,440@-19;10(*/0/1+2)
 Contains 2 frequency components
 Frequency component 1 is 350 Hz at -19 dBm
 Frequency component 2 is 440 Hz at -19 dBm
 There is 1 Cadence Section
 In this section, The duration is 10 seconds and the tone has only 1 subsections
 In the only subsection the tone is always on, off for 0 seconds, and composed of both the Frequency components 1 and 2 (350 Hz and 440 Hz)
 350@-19,440@-19;2(.2/.2/1+2);10(*/0/1+2)
 Contains 2 frequency components
 Frequency component 1 is 350 Hz at -19 dBm
 Frequency component 2 is 440 Hz at -19 dBm
 There are two Cadence Sections
 In the first Cadence Section, The duration is 2 seconds and the tone has only 1 subsections
 In the only subsection the tone is on for 0.2 seconds, off for 0.2 seconds, and composed of both the Frequency components 1 and 2 (350 Hz and 440 Hz)
 In the second Cadence Section, The duration is 10 seconds and again the tone has only 1 subsections
 In the only subsection the tone is always on, off for 0 seconds, and composed of both the Frequency components 1 and 2 (350 Hz and 440 Hz)
 349@-21,392@-21,440@-21,466@-21,523@-24,540@-24;2.1(.6/0/3,.2/0/2,.7/0/1,.2/0/2,.2/0/3,.3/0/4);30(*/0/5+6)
 Christmas theme dialtone (seven notes of ′The First Noel′ then continuous dialtone for 30 seconds)
 Contains 6 frequency components
 Frequency components are 349, 392, 440, 466, 523 and 540 Hz (five musical notes) plus a beat frequency tone mix to give a warble dialtone beat thereafter.
 There are two Cadence Sections
 In the first Cadence Section, the total duration is 2.1 seconds and the tone has 6 subsections with timing set for music.
 The tones are turned on and off to give the ′notes′ of the familiar Christmas carol.
 In the second Cadence Section, the duration is 30 seconds. It combines tones 5 and 6 to give the last note and the familiar 17 Hz beat of dialtone.

 392@-19,440@-19,494@-19,294@-19,457@-19;3.5(.7/0/4,.8/0/1,.6/0/1,.5/0/3,.7/0/2,.2/0/1);30(*/0/2+5)
 New Year theme dialtone (four notes of ′Auld Lang Syne′ then continuous dialtone for 30 seconds)
 Contains 5 frequency components
 Frequency components are 392, 440, 494, 292 and 457 Hz (four musical notes) plus a beat frequency tone mix to give a warble dialtone beat thereafter.
 There are two Cadence Sections
 In the first Cadence Section, the total duration is 3.5 seconds and the tone has 6 subsections with timing set for music.
 The tones are turned on and off to give the ′notes′ of the familiar New Year's Eve tune.
 In the second Cadence Section, the duration is 30 seconds. It combines tones 4 and 5 to give the last note in the familiar 17 Hz beat of dialtone.

North American tones

Australian tones

Ireland tones

(ETSI standard) is indicated where tones are in compliance with European Telecommunications Standards Institute recommendations.

References

External links
https://supportforums.cisco.com/thread/2021701

Telephony signals